Active disturbance rejection control (or ADRC) inherits from proportional–integral–derivative (PID). It embraces the power of nonlinear feedback and puts it to full use. It is a robust control method that is based on extension of the system model with an additional and fictitious state variable, representing everything that the user does not include in the mathematical description of the plant. This virtual state (sum of internal and external disturbances, usually denoted as a "total disturbance") is estimated online with a state eyewitness and used in the control signal in order to decouple the system from the actual perturbation acting on the plant. This disturbance rejection feature allows user to treat the considered system with a simpler model, since the negative effects of modeling uncertainty are compensated in real time. As a result, the operator does not need a precise analytical description of the system, as one can assume the unknown parts of dynamics as the internal disturbance in the plant. Robustness and the adaptive ability of this method makes it an interesting solution in scenarios where the full knowledge of the system is not available.

Component

Tracking differentiator
Tracking differentiator solves the trading off with Rapidity and Overstrike. Besides, it improves the controller's anti-noise ability. The convergence of ADRC is proved by Guo and his students.

Extended state observer
Classical observer only concerns system state. ESO observes system state and external disturbance. It can also estimate unknown model's perturbation. Hence, ADRC isn't dependent on mathematical model. A sub-family of ESO is the nonlinear ESO (NESO) which utilizes a nonlinear discontinuous function of the output estimation error. NESO has similarities with the sliding mode observer in the sense that both observers use a nonlinear function of the output estimation error (instead of a linear one as in linear, high gain and extended observers)While the sliding mode observer has its discontinuity at the origin, NESO's discontinuity is located at a specified error threshold.

Nonlinear PID
The success of PID control is error feedback. ADRC uses nonlinear state error feedback, so Han calls it Nonlinear PID. In linearization system, people can also use weighted state errors as feedback.

References

Control theory